Stephanie Bidmead (29 January 1929 – 22 September 1974) was a British stage and television actress.

Early life
She was born in Kidderminster. She attended Kidderminster High School for Girls, a girls' grammar school, now part of King Charles I School since 1977.

Career
She was a member of the Royal Shakespeare Company in the late 1950s, and played in Peter Brook's 1957 production of The Tempest and in 1959 played opposite Charles Laughton in King Lear and A Midsummer Night's Dream.

She began to work in television during the 1960s, with credits in Doctor Who,  the final episode of Maigret and Adam Adamant Lives!. In the Doctor Who serial Galaxy 4 she played the Drahvin leader Maaga.

In 1972 she played the lead role of Queen Elizabeth I in Robert Bolt's play Vivat! Vivat Regina! in the Birmingham Rep production.

Personal life
She had two sons with Moravian theatre designer Henry Bardon. She was diagnosed with anterior horn cell myelitis and died on 22 September 1974 at the age of 45.

Filmography

Film
1965: Invasion - Elaine
1972: Running Scared - Mrs. Case

Television
1960: An Age of Kings (Episode: "Henry V") - Queen of France
1963: Jane Eyre  - Leah        
1963: Maigret - Maigret's Little Joke- Antoinette Videl        
1964: R3 (Episode: ""On the Spike") - Doris Haley
1964: Crane (Episode: "Knife in the Dark") - Annette Brillon
1964: Coronation Street - Lily Haddon
1965: The Mask of Janus (Episode: "And the Fish Are Biting") - Sylvie
1965: Doctor Who (Episode: "Galaxy 4") - Maaga
1965: Sherlock Holmes (Episode: "Charles Augustus Milverton") - Lady Farmingham
1966: Adam Adamant Lives! (Episode: "Death Has a Thousand Faces") - Madame Delvario
1968: The Devil in the Fog - Lady Dexter
1971: Public Eye (Episode: "Ward of Court") - Ruth
1971: Doomwatch (Episode: "The Web of Fear") - Janine
1973: The Onedin Line (Episode: "Law of the Fist") - Mrs Darling
1973: Bedtime Stories (Episode: "Jack and the Beanstalk") - Linda Weir (final appearance)

References

External links

1929 births
1974 deaths
English stage actresses
English television actresses
20th-century British actresses
People from Kidderminster
20th-century English women
20th-century English people